Upper Colne Marshes is a  biological Site of Special Scientific Interest south and west of Wivenhoe in Essex. It lies along stretches of the River Colne and Roman River.

The site has grazing marshes, salt tidal marshes, beaches, sea walls and intertidal mud. It has an important assemblage of nationally scarce plants and diverse ditch types. The grassland is species rich, with rare types such as sea barley, and salt marsh has the nationally uncommon lax-flowered sea-lavender. Insects include the nationally scarce Roesel's bush-cricket.

The site is in five areas, some of which are crossed by roads and footpaths.

References 

Sites of Special Scientific Interest in Essex